Diplodus vulgaris, the common two-banded sea bream, is a species of seabream belonging to the family Sparidae.

Description
Body is generally grey-silver, with two well-defined vertical black bands, one close to the gills and one in the rear of the body, just before the base of the caudal fin. Another black stripe, less pronounced, is present near the eyes. There are golden lines along the body, typically on the back.

Lips are rather thick. In each jaw, there are 8 narrow, light-brownish incisors. In the western Mediterranean, it reproduces in October and November and in the eastern Mediterranean in December and January.

It is a gregarious species, sometimes forming groups composed even by many specimens. In the shallows, it often creates smaller groups even with other similar species.

Adults feed on benthic invertebrates, crustaceans, worms and mollusks. It is considered an important food fish.

Distribution and habitat
This species is widespread in the Mediterranean Sea, in the Black Sea and in the Eastern Atlantic Ocean, at depths of 0 to 160 m, more commonly between 0 and 30 m.

It inhabits rocky, sandy bottoms and seagrass beds. On sandy bottoms, it can be often found following species that dig the sand and trying to steal their food.

Fishing
It is often caught in various nets, fish traps and light longlines. Locally, it is very important catch for artisanal fishermen and can be often found fresh in local fish markets.

In sport fishing, it is often caught from shore or from boat on rod and real or handline and in shallow waters often on rigs with floats. It is not very picky about its bait and will grab hooks baited with small chunks of fish, various worms, small prawns, mussels, various pastes, bread, cheese and similar. Sometimes it can be caught while trolling from shore on European seabass or common dentex using live prawns as bait.

Larger specimens are often caught with a speargun.

Cuisine
It is one of the best tasting fish, especially larger specimen. Barbequed with some olive oil, garlic, parsley and few drops of lemon is a delicacy. In mixed fish stew, especially when there is some fatty fish like eels, it also has great taste and aroma.

It can be used for fish soups, or even pan fried, especially smaller specimens.

References

Bauchot, M.L. and J.C. Hureau, 1990.  - Sparidae. p. 790-812 
MondoMarino.net

External links
 

vulgaris
Fish of the East Atlantic
Fish of the Black Sea
Fish of the Mediterranean Sea
Marine fauna of North Africa
Marine fauna of West Africa
Taxa named by Étienne Geoffroy Saint-Hilaire
Fish described in 1817